Markus Hoelgaard (born 4 October 1994) is a Norwegian racing cyclist, who currently rides for UCI WorldTeam . He rode at the 2013 UCI Road World Championships.  He is the brother of fellow racing cyclist Daniel Hoelgaard.

Major results

2012
 National Junior Road Championships
3rd Road race
3rd Time trial
 5th Paris–Roubaix Juniors
2014
 2nd Grand Prix Královéhradeckého kraje
 8th GP Czech Republic
2016
 2nd Overall ZLM Roompot Tour
1st Stage 1 (TTT)
 3rd Road race, National Under-23 Road Championships
 7th Ringerike GP
 10th Overall Course de la Paix U23
2017
 1st Stage 1 Tour Alsace
 5th Ringerike GP
 6th Druivenkoers Overijse
 8th Overall Circuit des Ardennes
1st Stage 1
 8th Overall Ronde de l'Oise
2018
 2nd Overall Arctic Race of Norway
1st  Young rider classification
 3rd Gylne Gutuer
 8th Grote Prijs Jef Scherens
2019
 2nd Overall International Tour of Rhodes
 3rd Overall Oberösterreich Rundfahrt
 7th Overall Arctic Race of Norway
1st Stage 4
2020
 2nd Overall Tour de Luxembourg
 3rd Overall Czech Cycling Tour
2021
 1st Stage 1 Arctic Race of Norway
 2nd Overall CRO Race
 4th Overall Tour of Norway
 7th Road race, UEC European Road Championships
 8th E3 Saxo Bank Classic

References

External links
 
 
 
 
 
 
 

1994 births
Living people
Norwegian male cyclists
Sportspeople from Stavanger
Olympic cyclists of Norway
Cyclists at the 2020 Summer Olympics